Samuel Hedges House is a historic home located near Hedgesville in Berkeley County, West Virginia, United States. It is a two-story, "L"-shaped dwelling with a three-bay wide, gable roofed limestone main block and frame ell. The main block was built about 1772 and the addition built in the mid-1850s. It features a pedimented entrance porch supported by Doric order columns. Also on the property is a -story coursed-rubble outbuilding and a log smokehouse.

It was listed on the National Register of Historic Places in 1976.

References

Houses on the National Register of Historic Places in West Virginia
Houses completed in 1772
Houses in Berkeley County, West Virginia
National Register of Historic Places in Berkeley County, West Virginia
Stone houses in West Virginia
Limestone buildings in the United States